The East Anglian Premier Cricket League is the top level of competition for recreational club cricket in the English region of East Anglia. Since it was formed in 1999 the league has been a designated ECB Premier League. It has three feeder leagues: the Cambridgeshire and Huntingdonshire Premier League, the Norfolk Cricket Alliance, and the Two Counties Cricket Championship (which covers Suffolk and the north of Essex). The winners of these three leagues are eligible for promotion to the East Anglian Premier Cricket League. Should more than one of them wish to join the league in the same season then a playoff is held.

The 2020 competition was cancelled because of the COVID-19 pandemic. A replacement competition was organised for the later part of the season when cricket again became possible, but with the winners not to be regarded as official league champions.

Champions

Performance by season from 1999

References

External links
 Official website
 play-cricket website

English domestic cricket competitions
Cricket in Norfolk
Cricket in Suffolk
ECB Premier Leagues